Michał Przysiężny was the defending champion, but had to retire in the final. As a result, Ričardas Berankis won this tournament.

Seeds

Draw

Finals

Top half

Bottom half

References
 Main Draw
 Qualifying Draw

IPP Open - Singles
IPP Open